Pierre Jarlier (born 14 July 1954) is a French politician and a former member of the Senate of France. He represented the Cantal department (since 27 September 1998) and is a member of the Radical Party.

References
Page on the Senate website

1954 births
Living people
Radical Party (France) politicians
French Senators of the Fifth Republic
Union for a Popular Movement politicians
Union of Democrats and Independents politicians
Senators of Cantal